The African wading rat or African water rat (Colomys goslingi) is a species of rodent in the family Muridae.  It is native to Africa, where it occurs in Angola, Burundi, Cameroon, Republic of the Congo, Democratic Republic of the Congo, Equatorial Guinea, Ethiopia, Gabon, Kenya, Liberia, Rwanda, South Sudan, Uganda, and Zambia.

An aquatic species, this rat is found in and around streams and pools in rainforest habitat, and sometimes in grassland and savanna regions.

In 2020, a team of researchers from Siena College established that it is actually four separate species: the other three species have been named Colomys wologizi, C. lumumbai, and C. eisentrauti.

References

Notes
 Colomys. Integrated Taxonomic Information System. (ITIS)

Rodents of Africa
Old World rats and mice
Mammals described in 1907
Taxa named by Oldfield Thomas
Taxonomy articles created by Polbot